Govan subway station is a station serving the area of Govan in Glasgow, Scotland. It is located on the south side of the River Clyde. Just to the south of the station is the main depot and test track for the Glasgow Subway. The station is located near the historic Govan Old Parish Church.

This station forms an interchange station, being adjacent to Govan bus station.  This combined with the fact that the subway to Partick forms the only rail link across the Clyde west of the city centre means that it is one of the busier stations.  Annual passenger boardings have fallen below one million in recent years and were recorded at 990,000 in 2004/05.

The station has two platforms. Prior to closure for modernisation in 1977 the station was called Govan Cross. The appearance of cracks in the roof of the old station led to the premature closure of the unmodernised railway in 1977. As part of the resulting modernisation programme, the station's surface buildings were replaced and its single island platform changed to a dual side platform arrangement.

Govan (under its former name of Govan Cross) is one of the stations mentioned in Cliff Hanley's song The Glasgow Underground.

Govan includes a lift and escalator. Along with St Enoch subway station, it is one of two Glasgow Subway stations that is wheelchair accessible.

On 29 June 2011, a man died after being hit by one of the service's rolling stock at 09:12.

Past passenger numbers 
 2004/05: 0.990 million annually
 2011/12: 0.945 million annually

References 

Glasgow Subway stations
Railway stations in Great Britain opened in 1896
1896 establishments in Scotland
Govan
Railway stations located underground in the United Kingdom